Mountains are widely distributed across the surface of Io, the innermost large moon of Jupiter. Ionian mountains often appear as large, isolated structures; no global tectonic pattern is evident, unlike on Earth, where plate tectonics is dominant.

Io is exceptional for the strong tidal heating it undergoes, caused by the eccentricity of its orbit (which results from its resonance with Europa and Ganymede) in conjunction with the proximity and great mass of Jupiter. This leads to widespread and intensive volcanism. 
Several geodynamic models of Io exist but the tectonic mountain-building process is still obscure and debatable. However, it is thought to be related to stresses caused by the rapid volcanic resurfacing of the body.

Observations 

To explore the origin of Io's mountains, classification of morphological types and description of morphological features are necessary.

Morphological types

Four morphological types of mountains have been identified.

 Mesa: a mountain with flat top and relatively smooth surface. It may be difficult to distinguish mesas from eroded layered plains. Ethiopia Planum is a good example of this morphological type. Eleven mountains on Io are classified as mesas. 
 Plateau: an elevated plain with a rugged surface. There is no steep or prominent peak on plateau. Iopolis Planum is a good example of this type. About 46% of Ionian mountains belong to this morphological type.
 Ridge: an elevated structure dominated by one or more linear or arcuate rises. 28 (24%) mountains on Io have been cataloged into this type.
 Massif: an elevated structure dominated by rugged or complex surface and has one or more peaks. Boösaule Montes and Tohil Mons are good examples.

Common features

Several common features of Ionian mountains have been summarized.
 Basal scarps: basal scarps always appear as an abrupt boundary of Ionian mountains that separate mountains from volcanic plains. Most Ionian mountains are observed to have this feature. The basal scarps are ten to a few hundred meters high.  Sometimes, the scarp is resolved in high-resolution images as the margin of a debris apron. An example is Iopolis Planum.
 Tilted block: thrust faults have been interpreted to bound tilted blocks on Io. Tilted blocks have a polygonal shape and curved crests. One example is Euboea Montes. A terrestrial analogy is the Black Hills of South Dakota.
 Mass wasting: several types of mass movement deposits have been observed adjacent to Ionian mountains. Downslope movements of blocks have been noted in at least one place, the Euboea Montes. Fan-shaped deposits resembling debris aprons are found at the base of steep slopes. The ridged or crenulated surfaces of some mountains like northern Hi'iaka Montes may be formed by downslope creep of layered rock.
 Layered crust: the upper Ionian crust may be layered, as suggested by flowing observations: mountain uplifted  and exposed crust section at Euboea Montes, different colored units exposed on Haemus Mons, a ridged unit atop northern Hi'iaka Montes, and striations on mountains such as Haemus Mons and Tohil Mons.

Stresses 

Stress plays an important role in the origin of Io's mountains. Various kinds of stresses are considered to be responsible for the deformation of the lithosphere. Folding and faulting form all kinds of topographic features on Io.

 Overburden stress: on Io, the resurfacing process keeps forming new layers at the surface and pushing older layer downwards. Overburden stress is stress imposed on an older layer of rock by the weight of overlying younger layer of rock. The horizontal stress generated is less than the vertical overburden by a factor of  /(1- ),where  is Poisson's ratio (value is 0.25 for rock)/ref>. The differential stress is -(). This tensile stress is insufficient to cause faulting on Io, because the value is less than Byerlee's rule for rock failure in extension. However, the overburden stress may contribute to the faulting when combined with other stresses
 Subsidence stress: continuous burial of older crust by younger crust causes older rock to be pushed inward to a sphere with a smaller radius. This subsidence of older crust may imply enormous horizontal compressive stress. This stress is related to resurfacing rate (v), Io's radius (R), subsidence distance (ΔR) and Yong's modulus. The subsidence-generated horizontal stress is equal to E/(1-V)× ΔR/R. This stress is more than enough to cause faulting on Io.
 Thermal stress: thermal stress is another possible stress source on Io, as increasing temperature in Io's crust can cause expansion of the crust. The total tidal heating generated in Io is dissipated to resurfacing processes and conductive heat flow. The more heat used on resurfacing, the less heat can become conductive heat flow and the less thermal stress is caused by heat. The thermal stress is important as it can be generated wherever and whenever volcanic output is less than tidal heating input.

Geodynamic models 

Several models have been proposed to related this resurfacing process to accumulation of stress in the lithosphere.

Many mountains higher than  have been observed on Io. This implies that Io has a thick crust. In O'Reilly and Davies' 1981 paper, they proposed that part of the heat in Io is transported by advection. Magma from depths rises to the surface through isolated vents, and spreads out and cools at surface. The solid lithosphere subsides under the continuously generated new lava flow. Solid material is heated by conduction at the base of lithosphere and melts again.

The thrust faulting and uplifting of large crust blocks on Io are interpreted by a model proposed by Schenk and Bulmer's 1998 paper. In the model, Io's crust keeps recycling. Violent volcanic activity brings lava to the surface and older, buried layers are forced to subside. The old volcanic crust materials are compressed laterally as they sink.

A later model presents more details. Io consists of a continuous stack of mafic and ultramafic deposits. After new erupted volcanic materials cool down and are buried, the stack of rocks become indurated and form bedrocks.  The bedrocks are fractured due to tidal flexing, compression at depth, volcanic intrusion and other mechanisms, and then are broken into large blocks a hundred kilometers across. Products of magmatism like sills, dikes and batholiths may intrude into layers of stacking volcanics to form a composite crust. Occasionally, the large blocks of crust are rotated and thrusted along deep-rooted thrust faults. This process may expose a cross-section of crust to the surface, as at Euboea Montes. Later, these blocks can also be eroded by mass wasting and reburied by subsequent volcanism.  At the base of the crust, materials are met again by heat. Compression at depth due to global burial and subsidence can also form ductile deformation like folding of crust.

Mountains and paterae 

Paterae and mountains are observed to appear near each other on Io. This observation indicates that these two structures are somehow related. As Io has strong tidal heating and very violent volcanic activities, the interior of Io should be vigorously convecting). Localized regions of up-welling and down-welling of mantle material could affect the stress field in Io's lithosphere. Buoyant mantle diapir can locally enhance the compressive stress which may be sufficient for the development of thrust faults. This mechanism would predict curved and circular mountains if it were responsible for the initiating faulting.  However, many Ionian mountains are observed to have straight margins. This contradiction indicates that faults exist before the raising of diapirs. Thus, diapirs only provide a mechanism for focusing the stresses in Io's lithosphere.  Fractures that are not under compression stress induced by underlying diapiring processes could serve as conduits through which the melt erupts onto the surface.  Meanwhile, in a global view, an anti-correlation between the distributions of mountains and volcanic centers is observed on Io. This may reflect a global convective pattern. On the hemisphere which is dominated by up-welling, there are more volcanic centers. On the hemisphere that is dominated by down-welling, there are more mountains.

See also
Volcanology of Io
List of mountains on Io

References

External links 

Io image archive from the Galileo mission
Io images 
Topography and Mountains on Io 
Io in 3-D
Tidal Heating tutorial